The White House Doctor: My Patients Were Presidents – A Memoir is a book authored by Connie Mariano, the first military woman in the history of the United States to be appointed as Physician to the President, the first female director of the medical unit of the White House, and the first Filipino-American to become a rear admiral in the US Navy. With a foreword from Bill Clinton, the autobiographical book takes a look at the personal lives of three American Presidents (George H. W. Bush, Bill Clinton, and George W. Bush) and three American First Ladies (Barbara Bush, Hillary Clinton, and Laura Bush) she had taken care of while working as a White House physician.  It was described as a "fascinating look into what goes on behind closed doors at 1600 Pennsylvania Avenue".

References

External links
 The White House Doctor Book

Asian-American literature
2010 non-fiction books
American autobiographies
Filipino-American history
American memoirs
Health of United States presidents
Literature by Asian-American women
 
Presidency of the United States